Solihin Gautama Purwanegara (born 21 July 1926) is an Indonesian former military officer and politician who served as governor of West Java from 1970 to 1975. As a student, he joined the Indonesian Army during the national revolution. Following the recognition of Indonesian sovereignty in 1949, he served mostly within the Siliwangi Military Region before joining the Hasanuddin Military Region and later becoming its commander. He was appointed as West Java's governor in 1970, but due to disagreements on policy with the central government he served only a single term. He remained a figure in politics after his governorship, serving in an advisory capacity to President Suharto until 1993. He also briefly joined PDI-P after Suharto's downfall, and was involved in the presidential campaigns of Joko Widodo.

Early life and education 

Solihin Gautama Purwanegara was born on 21 July 1926, in Tasikmalaya, Preanger Regencies Residency, Dutch East Indies (now West Java, Indonesia). He was the son of Abdulgani Poerwanegara, a civil servant in the colonial government who had worked in Bandung and Garut, and Siti Ningrum. He studied at a colonial elementary school (Europeesche Lagere School) and for two years at a Dutch middle school (Meer Uitgebreid Lager Onderwijs).

Military career 

The Indonesian National Revolution broke out while he was in high school, and he joined the Indonesian Armed Forces; he took his final exams in combat uniform. He also fought against the Indonesian Communist Party following the Madiun Affair in 1948. Later on, he took part in operations against the Darul Islam rebellion in West Java. Early on, he was assigned to the Siliwangi Military Region in West Java, with an assignment in Bangka as a battalion commander from 1951 to 1953. He studied at the Army Staff and Command School between 1953 and 1954, taught there between 1954 and 1956, and then took a one-year course in the United States. 

After his further studies, he returned to Siliwangi and served there until 1964. He then moved to the Hasanuddin Military Region in South Sulawesi, taking part in operations against Abdul Kahar Muzakkar's Darul Islam branch. He became Hasanuddin's commander in 1965. In an anecdote given in his predecessor Mohammad Jusuf's biography, Solihin was asleep at a ceremony when Jusuf unexpectedly named Solihin as his successor, with Solihin's adjutant having to wake him up to inform him of the announcement. He was then appointed as governor of the army section of the Indonesian Armed Forces Academy (AKABRI Bagian Darat) on 15 July 1968. His final rank in the military was lieutenant general.

Governor 

Solihin was sworn in as governor of West Java in 1970. His deputy was Nasuhi who used to be his direct superior in the armed forces during the revolution – Nasuhi was a batallion commander and Solihin was a company commander in the battalion. By Solihin's account, he was shortly thereafter invited to Jakarta by the capital's governor Ali Sadikin. During Solihin's visit there, Ali noted how the regions of West Java bordering Jakarta were underdeveloped, and remarked that the province should cede the border regions to Jakarta so that they could be better developed. Solihin noted that he took offense to this, and thus focused his attention on said regions – particularly Tangerang, Bekasi and Puncak being developed for the textile, cement, and tourist industries, respectively. 

Unlike standard government practice in Indonesia at the time to directly select lower-ranked executive officials, Solihin permitted significant local leeway in the selection of regents during his tenure, in addition to allowing local governments more control over tax revenues. He also privatized loss-making public companies and assets, such as fallow agricultural land. Due to disagreements on these policies with Minister of Home Affairs Amir Machmud, Solihin did not continue for a second term in office, and his governorship expired in 1975.

Later career 

After his gubernatorial career, Solihin briefly retired into a rural agricultural estate, until he was appointed as Presidential Secretary for Development Operations Control in 1977. He served in this capacity until 1993, and then joined the Supreme Advisory Council and became a president commissioner at a joint venture firm between two state-owned companies. He joined PDI-P shortly after the fall of Suharto, and became a member of the People's Consultative Assembly (MPR) as a regional delegate, but left PDI-P due to disagreements regarding amendments to the Constitution of Indonesia. As a MPR member, he also opposed the formation of a special commission to audit the personal wealth of government officials, claiming that the body would be ineffective and a waste of funds. The commission itself reported Solihin to the police due to his refusal to submit an assessment of his personal assets. Between 2000 and 2004, Solihin also campaigned against a normalization project of the Ci Tanduy river bank, along with later minister Susi Pudjiastuti.

Solihin continued to receive visits from high-profile politicians after his retirement, including Susilo Bambang Yudhoyono and Joko Widodo prior to their presidential campaigns in 2004 and 2014. Solihin openly endorsed Widodo's successful runs as president in both the 2014 and 2019 elections, and was an advisor to Widodo's campaign team in 2019. Solihin suffered from a light stroke in 2017 and was hospitalized, with Widodo visiting him. Widodo paid him another visit in 2018. Solihin was further infected with COVID-19 in 2021, and a hoax spread on social media reporting his death.

References

1926 births
Living people
Members of the People's Consultative Assembly
Governors of West Java
Indonesian generals
People from Tasikmalaya